The 2004–05 NBA season was the 64th season for the Pistons, the 57th in the National Basketball Association, and the 48th in the Detroit area. During the offseason, the Pistons signed free agent Antonio McDyess. Coming off their upset victory over the Los Angeles Lakers in the NBA Finals, the Pistons began the season playing around .500. However, things would get out of hand at the end of a November 19 game against the Indiana Pacers, when a huge brawl occurred between Pacers players and Pistons fans after Ben Wallace and Ron Artest got into a shoving match. As the season progressed, the Pistons would post an 11-game winning streak near the end of the season, and would eventually finish first overall in the Central Division, and second overall in the Eastern Conference with a 54–28 record. Ben Wallace was named Defensive Player of the Year for the third time, and was selected for the 2005 NBA All-Star Game.

In the first round of the playoffs, the Pistons defeated the Philadelphia 76ers in five games, then defeated the 6th-seeded Pacers in six games in the second round. The Pistons would then defeat the top-seeded Miami Heat in a full seven game series after trailing 3–2 to advance to the Finals for the second straight year. However, they narrowly missed out on repeating as NBA champions, losing to the San Antonio Spurs in the 2005 NBA Finals in seven games.

After the Finals defeat, Larry Brown and the Pistons parted ways after spending two seasons as head coach. He would later be the head coach of his hometown New York Knicks, but after winning only 23 games in his only season in New York, Brown was fired again before returning to coaching with the Charlotte Bobcats. It was later announced in the off-season that Flip Saunders, who was fired as head coach of the Minnesota Timberwolves at midseason, would be the Pistons head coach for next season.

Draft picks

Roster

Regular season

Standings

Record vs. opponents

Playoffs

|- align="center" bgcolor="#ccffcc"
| 1
| April 23
| Philadelphia
| W 106–85
| Rasheed Wallace (29)
| B. Wallace, R. Wallace (10)
| Richard Hamilton (5)
| The Palace of Auburn Hills22,076
| 1–0
|- align="center" bgcolor="#ccffcc"
| 2
| April 26
| Philadelphia
| W 99–84
| Richard Hamilton (23)
| Ben Wallace (10)
| Chauncey Billups (8)
| The Palace of Auburn Hills22,076
| 2–0
|- align="center" bgcolor="#ffcccc"
| 3
| April 29
| @ Philadelphia
| L 104–115
| Ben Wallace (29)
| Ben Wallace (16)
| Richard Hamilton (12)
| Wachovia Center16,907
| 2–1
|- align="center" bgcolor="#ccffcc"
| 4
| May 1
| @ Philadelphia
| W 97–92 (OT)
| Chauncey Billups (25)
| Ben Wallace (12)
| Chauncey Billups (7)
| Wachovia Center15,894
| 3–1
|- align="center" bgcolor="#ccffcc"
| 5
| May 3
| Philadelphia
| W 88–78
| Billups, Hamilton (23)
| Ben Wallace (13)
| Chauncey Billups (7)
| The Palace of Auburn Hills22,076
| 4–1
|-

|- align="center" bgcolor="#ccffcc"
| 1
| May 9
| Indiana
| W 96–81
| Richard Hamilton (28)
| Ben Wallace (15)
| Chauncey Billups (7)
| The Palace of Auburn Hills22,076
| 1–0
|- align="center" bgcolor="#ffcccc"
| 2
| May 11
| Indiana
| L 83–92
| Tayshaun Prince (24)
| Ben Wallace (16)
| Chauncey Billups (10)
| The Palace of Auburn Hills22,076
| 1–1
|- align="center" bgcolor="#ffcccc"
| 3
| May 13
| @ Indiana
| L 74–79
| Chauncey Billups (23)
| Ben Wallace (14)
| Tayshaun Prince (6)
| Conseco Fieldhouse18,345
| 1–2
|- align="center" bgcolor="#ccffcc"
| 4
| May 15
| @ Indiana
| W 89–76
| Chauncey Billups (29)
| Rasheed Wallace (12)
| Richard Hamilton (7)
| Conseco Fieldhouse18,345
| 2–2
|- align="center" bgcolor="#ccffcc"
| 5
| May 17
| Indiana
| W 86–67
| Ben Wallace (19)
| Tayshaun Prince (9)
| Chauncey Billups (7)
| The Palace of Auburn Hills22,076
| 3–2
|- align="center" bgcolor="#ccffcc"
| 6
| May 19
| @ Indiana
| W 88–79
| Richard Hamilton (28)
| B. Wallace, R. Wallace (11)
| Chauncey Billups (8)
| Conseco Fieldhouse18,345
| 4–2
|-

|- align="center" bgcolor="#ccffcc"
| 1
| May 23
| @ Miami
| W 90–81
| Rasheed Wallace (20)
| Ben Wallace (13)
| Carlos Arroyo (7)
| American Airlines Arena20,203
| 1–0
|- align="center" bgcolor="#ffcccc"
| 2
| May 25
| @ Miami
| L 86–92
| Richard Hamilton (21)
| Ben Wallace (14)
| Chauncey Billups (6)
| American Airlines Arena20,228
| 1–1
|- align="center" bgcolor="#ffcccc"
| 3
| May 29
| Miami
| L 104–113
| Richard Hamilton (33)
| Rasheed Wallace (8)
| Richard Hamilton (5)
| The Palace of Auburn Hills22,076
| 1–2
|- align="center" bgcolor="#ccffcc"
| 4
| May 31
| Miami
| W 106–96
| Richard Hamilton (28)
| Ben Wallace (15)
| Richard Hamilton (8)
| The Palace of Auburn Hills22,076
| 2–2
|- align="center" bgcolor="#ffcccc"
| 5
| June 2
| @ Miami
| L 76–88
| Richard Hamilton (21)
| Antonio McDyess (9)
| Richard Hamilton (5)
| American Airlines Arena20,225
| 2–3
|- align="center" bgcolor="#ccffcc"
| 6
| June 4
| Miami
| W 91–66
| Richard Hamilton (24)
| Prince, R. Wallace 99)
| Chauncey Billups (7)
| The Palace of Auburn Hills22,076
| 3–3
|- align="center" bgcolor="#ccffcc"
| 7
| June 6
| @ Miami
| W 88–82
| Richard Hamilton (22)
| Ben Wallace (9)
| Chauncey Billups (8)
| American Airlines Arena20,241
| 4–3
|-

|- align="center" bgcolor="#ffcccc"
| 1
| June 9
| @ San Antonio
| L 69–84
| Chauncey Billups (25)
| Ben Wallace (8)
| Chauncey Billups (6)
| SBC Center18,797
| 0–1
|- align="center" bgcolor="#ffcccc"
| 2
| June 12
| @ San Antonio
| L 76–97
| Antonio McDyess (15)
| B. Wallace, R. Wallace (8)
| Rasheed Wallace (4)
| SBC Center18,797
| 0–2
|- align="center" bgcolor="#ccffcc"
| 3
| June 14
| San Antonio
| W 96–79
| Richard Hamilton (24)
| Ben Wallace (11)
| Chauncey Billups (7)
| The Palace of Auburn Hills22,076
| 1–2
|- align="center" bgcolor="#ccffcc"
| 4
| June 16
| San Antonio
| W 102–71
| Billups, Hunter (17)
| Ben Wallace (13)
| Chauncey Billups (7)
| The Palace of Auburn Hills22,076
| 2–2
|- align="center" bgcolor="#ffcccc"
| 5
| June 19
| San Antonio
| L 95–96 (OT)
| Chauncey Billups (34)
| Ben Wallace (12)
| Chauncey Billups (7)
| The Palace of Auburn Hills22,076
| 2–3
|- align="center" bgcolor="#ccffcc"
| 6
| June 21
| @ San Antonio
| W 95–86
| Richard Hamilton (23)
| Ben Wallace (9)
| Chauncey Billups (6)
| SBC Center18,797
| 3–3
|- align="center" bgcolor="#ffcccc"
| 7
| June 23
| @ San Antonio
| L 74–81
| Richard Hamilton (15)
| Ben Wallace (11)
| Chauncey Billups (8)
| SBC Center18,797
| 3–4
|-

Player statistics

Playoffs

Awards and records
Ben Wallace, NBA Defensive Player of the Year Award
Ben Wallace, All-NBA Third Team
Ben Wallace, NBA All-Defensive First Team
Chauncey Billups, NBA All-Defensive Second Team
Tayshaun Prince, NBA All-Defensive Second Team

Transactions

External links
 Detroit Pistons on Database Basketball
 Detroit Pistons on Basketball Reference

References

Det
Detroit Pistons seasons
Eastern Conference (NBA) championship seasons
Detroit
Detroit